Private Frank Emil Fesq (April 4, 1840 – May 6, 1920) was a German soldier who fought in the American Civil War. He received the United States' highest award for bravery during combat, the Medal of Honor, for his action during the Third Battle of Petersburg in Virginia on April 2, 1865. He was honored with the award on May 10, 1865.

Biography
Fesq was born in Brunswick, Germany on April 4, 1840. He volunteered for the 40th New Jersey Infantry in late 1864 (the unit was not officially organized until February 1865), and mustered out with the regiment in July 1865.

He died on May 6, 1920, and his remains are interred at the Rosedale Cemetery in Orange, New Jersey.

Medal of Honor citation

See also

List of American Civil War Medal of Honor recipients: A–F

References

1840 births
1920 deaths
 German-born Medal of Honor recipients
 People of New Jersey in the American Civil War
Military personnel from Braunschweig
 People from the Duchy of Brunswick
 Union Army officers
 United States Army Medal of Honor recipients
 American Civil War recipients of the Medal of Honor
German emigrants to the United States